The 1972–73 FIBA Women's European Champions Cup was the thirteenth edition of FIBA Europe's competition for women's basketball national champion clubs, running from November 1972 to March 1973. Daugava Riga defeated Clermont UC in the final to win its tenth title in a row.

Preliminary round

First round

Group stage

Group A

Group B

Semifinals

Final

References

Champions Cup
EuroLeague Women seasons